Uzbekistan Second League is the third highest football league in Uzbekistan. In second phase of the season 11 teams participated for promotion to higher league level.

Teams of second championship phase

League format
Season comprise two phases. In first phase teams play against each other in regional competitions to promote to the second phase. In second phase teams are split into 2 regional groups "East" and "West" and compete for promotion to higher level. Four teams promote to Uzbekistan First League.

Second phase

In the second phase of 2012 season 11 clubs participated split into two groups. At the end of season Lokomotiv BFK, Hotira-79, Sherdor-Presstizh and Spartak Bukhoro gained promotion to Uzbekistan First League.

Final standings in groups after last matchday.

Group East

Group West

References

External links
Uzbekistan Professional League

Uzbekistan Second League seasons
3